The timeline of the 2020 United States presidential election has been split into three parts for convenience:
Timeline of the 2020 United States presidential election (2017–2019)
Timeline of the 2020 United States presidential election (January–October 2020)
Timeline of the 2020 United States presidential election (November 2020–January 2021)

Timeline
2020
Articles which contain graphical timelines
2019 timelines
2020 timelines